No. 12 Squadron is a unit of the Indian Air Force assigned to Central Command. The Squadron participates in operations involving air, land and airdrop of troops, equipment, supplies, and support or augment special operations forces, when appropriate.

History
The No. 12 Squadron was raised in 1945 at Kohat and moved to the present location in Aug 1947. Also known as "The Striking Yaks".

Lineage
 Constituted as No. 12 Squadron (Yaks) on 1 December 1945

Assignments
 Indo-Pakistani War of 1965
 Indo-Pakistani War of 1971

Aircraft
 Spitfire
 C-47
 AN-32

References

012